Whitehorse Falls is a  waterfall on the Clearwater River, in Douglas County in the U.S. state of Oregon. It is located within the Whitehorse Falls Campground, about 4 miles east of Toketee Lake along Oregon Route 138.

The falls are a featured point along the route between the cities of Chemult and Roseburg. It is located in the heart of the Umpqua National Forest. It consists of a recreational trail that leads to the waterfall, a short distance from the confluence of the North Umpqua and Clearwater rivers. The picnic area near the parking lot has a viewing platform. Access to the waterfall and its trail is only through U.S. Highway 138. The area around the waterfall is surrounded by moss-covered rocks and canopy of old growth Douglas fir forest.

See also
List of waterfalls in Oregon

References

External links 
 Whitehorse Falls

Waterfalls of Douglas County, Oregon